At This Moment is the debut studio album by American country music artist Neal McCoy, released on November 20, 1990 on Atlantic Records Nashville. "If I Built You a Fire", "Hillbilly Blue" and "This Time I Hurt Her More (Than She Loves Me)" were all released as singles from this album. Although "Hillbilly Blue" did not chart, the other two singles both entered the lower regions of the Hot Country Songs charts. "If I Built You a Fire" was a Top 20 country hit in Canada as well.

Critical reception
A review in Billboard was mixed, stating that "McCoy is most convincing here in his cover of other people's hits...The newer material is unremarkable."

Track listing
"If I Built You a Fire" (Don Sampson, Monty Holmes) – 3:37
"Take My Heart" (Ron Reynolds, Mickey Stripling) – 2:40
"Down on the River" (Kostas, Wayland Patton) – 4:21
"Hillbilly Blue" (Bernie Nelson) – 3:23
"This Time I Hurt Her More (Than She Loves Me)" (Earl Thomas Conley, Mary Larkin) – 2:25
"Somebody Hold Me (Until She Passes By)" (Sue Richards, Ava Aldridge, Ray Aldridge) – 2:55
"The Big Heat" (Bob Mould, David Wills, Rick West) – 3:38
"If the Walls Had Ears" (John Alexander, Pal Rakes) – 3:27
"At This Moment" (Billy Vera) – 3:18
"This Time I'm Takin' My Time" (Mould, Wyatt Easterling) – 3:53

Personnel
Michael Black - background vocals 
Larry Byrom - electric guitar
Glen Duncan - fiddle
Wyatt Easterling - background vocals
Sonny Garrish - steel guitar
Steve Gibson - electric guitar
Bill Hullett - electric guitar
Clayton Ivey - keyboards
Jerry Kroon - drums
Gary Lunn - bass guitar
Neal McCoy - lead vocals
 Weldon Myrick  - steel guitar
Ron "Snake" Reynolds - electric guitar, percussion, background vocals
John Willis - acoustic guitar
Dennis Wilson - background vocals
Curtis Young - background vocals

References

1990 debut albums
Atlantic Records albums
Neal McCoy albums